Altar Boyz is a musical comedy with music and lyrics by Gary Adler and Michael Patrick Walker and book by Kevin Del Aguila (based on an idea by Marc J. Kessler and Ken Davenport). Centering on a fictitious Christian boy band from Ohio, the show satirizes, among other things, the phenomenon of boy bands and the popularity of Christian-themed music in contemporary American culture. It began an Off Broadway run on March 1, 2005, and closed on January 10, 2010, after sixteen previews and 2,032 regular performances, making it the 9th longest-running Off-Broadway musical of all time.

Plot
The musical is presented in real time as the final concert of the national "Raise the Praise" tour staged  by the five-member group the Altar Boyz. Four of the group's members, Matthew, Mark, Luke and Juan, apparently are named after the authors of the four canonical Christian Gospels. The fifth member is Abraham, who, the group explains in the show's opening number, is Jewish. The members of the group address the audience directly and refer to the venue and location in which the performance is taking place. The Altar Boyz perform their songs, with choreographed dancing in the style of boy bands, and present several scenes concerning the group and its origins, as well as each member's strengths and demons, as part of the concert.

During the show, the Altar Boyz repeatedly turn to a machine on stage, the "Soul Sensor DX-12," which has a display that they explain shows the number of burdened souls in the theatre.  Their goal is to reduce the number on the machine to zero by the end of the concert.

Synopsis

The Altar Boyz come out to introduce themselves. There is Matthew, the leader, Mark, the sensitive one, Luke, the bad boy, Juan, the Latin Lover, and Abraham the gefilte fish out of water. Abraham is Jewish (We Are The Altar Boyz). They go on to explain their love of God in song (Rhythm In Me). They use a gadget from SONY called the "Soul Sensor DX-12", which tells us how many souls that need to be saved. At this performance, 99 souls need to be saved. The first attempt of saving them comes from the Boyz singing about how to behave when at church (Church Rulez). This was a success.

The five Boyz proceed to perform biased skits based on what they remember happened. Matthew's point of view is the first that is discovered. He was having trouble writing a song when Mark entered the church. This song was for the retirement party of Father Lucas, a priest at the church that he goes to. Mark does not offer much help. In Mark's point of view, Matthew notices and compliments his hair, as Mark gets flustered. In this skit, Matthew says that he is writing a love song for Jesus. In Luke's point of view, his friends are completely silent when he enters the church. In Juan's point of view, he runs in, meeting the Boyz for the first time. He dramatically explains that he was born on a church in Tijuana, but found a way to Ohio, in search of his parents. Matthew, Mark, and Luke react very insensitively to this. In Abraham's point of view, he enters to give Luke his term paper, done for Luke by Abraham. Luke points out that Abraham is a writer, and Abraham agrees to help him write the song if he gives him a robe, and Matthew agrees. However, Abraham does not finish the song. Suddenly, they are encountered by God (Or, the voice of G.O.D), who demands for the Boyz to become a boy band. Abraham believes this is a mistake, but the Boyz obey. (The Calling).

After the song, the Boyz explain their jobs in the group. Matthew is the leader, Mark is the choreographer, Juan picked out the clothes, Abraham is the songwriter, and Luke drives the tour van. According to Matthew, Luke has had to go to rehabilitation, and Luke swears he went there for exhaustion. The Boyz break out in a rap about three of Jesus's miracles. They manage to save a few souls (The Miracle Song). Then, Abraham sings his own song, claiming that it doesn't matter who you are, but that you belong in God's family nonetheless (Everybody Fits).

Once the song is through, Matthew and the Boyz read scripted confessions, that were from the audience. The last of the confessions was from Larry, whose girlfriend has been pressuring him to lose his virginity. He'd like to do the same thing. Luke and Matthew are against it. Matthew sings a love song based on abstinence, bringing up a real audience member onstage, while Mark swoons, mistaking the song to be about him (Something About You). Matthew gives a souvenir to the audience member, a towelette, that was taken by Mark as she was led off the stage. Luke, fed up with Mark's jealousy, pleads for the Boyz, as well as the audience, to focus on their souls, as he has been working on his (Body, Mind, and Soul).

The soul sensor goes down to thirty three. Matthew has declared a surprise party for Juan, and have a very special letter that is addressed to him. The letter states that they have finally found Juan's parents, but said parents are no longer alive, and were found at a cemetery. This has led to all of the souls needing to be saved again. The Boyz try to continue the set list like normal, but Juan begins to cry and grieves his family. Abraham takes his place in singing his big song, but gives up on the dance break and attempts to search for him, who has run away and is trying to leave the theater. When the Boyz get him back, he gains confidence and continues his song with pride (La Vida Eternal).

There are ten people left whose souls still need to be saved. To save them, Mark shares his story with Episcopalian bullies, who have bullied him for his voice and his stylistic choices. Out of the blue, Matthew comes in to defend him from the bullies. Mark, smitten, calls him his guardian angel. This was his Catholic awakening (Epiphany). This has saved six souls, but there are still four left in the audience.

The Altar Boyz try to save those four whose souls are still lost with a song that they have never performed before, and only perform it on extreme measures. In the song, they try desperately to help, in any way possible, to save the audience (Number 918). This does not work. As Luke tries for an encore, Matthew stops the Boyz, and shamefully admits that he has signed a solo deal, and will be leaving the band. One by one, each boy admits that they will also be leaving the band after this performance. All except Abraham. Although he was offered, he refused. Now, he understands why he's in the band. Abraham gives his finally complete song to the band. One by one, each boy enters the song, and they sing together for one last time, promising that they will always be friends, and there's a reason why they're here (I Believe).

Production history
Directed by Stafford Arima and choreographed by Christopher Gattelli, Altar Boyz debuted at the 47th Street Theatre (The Puerto Rican Traveling Theatre) in New York City as part of the New York Musical Theatre Festival in September 2004. The NYMF cast included Cheyenne Jackson as Matthew, Tyler Maynard as Mark, Andy Karl as Luke, Ryan Dunca as Juan, and David Josefsberg as Abraham. Marc Kudisch performed the pre-recorded role of "G.O.D." Due to the nature of the festival, the NYMF run was limited to eight performances on an irregular schedule over the course of a few weeks.

After 16 preview performances, the show opened Off Broadway at Stage 4 of Dodger Stages (now New World Stages) on March 1, 2005. The cast was the same as in the NYMF production, except Scott Porter played the part of Matthew and Shadoe Stevens played the pre-recorded role of "G.O.D."  The production closed on January 10, 2010, after 2,032 regular performances, making it the ninth longest-running Off-Broadway musical of all time. The closing cast starred Michael Kadin Craig as Matthew, Travis Nesbitt as Mark, Lee Markham as Luke, Mauricio Pérez as Juan, and Ravi Roth as Abraham.

There have been touring productions of Altar Boyz in the United States (in 2007, 2008 and 2009) and resident productions in Chicago (2007), and South Korea, Hungary, Finland, Australia, the Philippines and Japan as well as numerous regional and amateur productions. In 2013 it was performed as part of the Adelaide Fringe.

Characters
Matthew: The leader of the band, who believes in sexual abstinence. First tenor of the group.
Mark: The sensitive choreographer of the band, who has a crush on Matthew, but is closeted. Countertenor of the group.
Luke: The bad boy of the band that drives the tour bus, who has had problems with communion wine and dropped out of school. Bass of the group.
Juan: The Latin lover of the band that picks out the clothes, who is searching for his parents. Second tenor of the group.
Abraham: The gefilte fish out of water who is also the songwriter. He is Jewish and isn't exactly sure why he's in a Catholic band. Baritone of the group.

Songs

We Are the Altar Boyz - Altar Boyz
Rhythm In Me - Altar Boyz
Church Rulez - Altar Boyz
The Calling - Altar Boyz
The Miracle Song - Altar Boyz
Everybody Fits - Abraham & Altar Boyz
Something About You - Matthew & Altar Boyz
Body, Mind & Soul - Luke & Altar Boyz
La Vida Eternal - Juan & Altar Boyz
Epiphany - Mark & Altar Boyz
Number 918 - Altar Boyz
Finale: I Believe - Altar Boyz
Bows & Altar Boyz Remix - Altar Boyz

Awards and nominations
Outer Critics Circle Award Best Off Broadway Musical (winner)
Drama Desk Award Outstanding Musical (nominee)
Drama Desk Award Outstanding Featured Actor in a Musical (Tyler Maynard, nominee)
Drama Desk Award Outstanding Choreography (Christopher Gattelli, nominee)
Drama Desk Award Outstanding Music (Gary Adler & Michael Patrick Walker, nominees)
Drama Desk Award Outstanding Lyrics (Gary Adler & Michael Patrick Walker, nominees)
Drama Desk Award Outstanding Book of a Musical (Kevin Del Aguila, nominee)
Drama Desk Award Outstanding Orchestrations (Doug Katsaros & Lynne Shankel, nominees)
Lucille Lortel Award Outstanding Musical (nominee)
Lucille Lortel Award Outstanding Choreography (Christopher Gattelli, winner)
Lucille Lortel Award Outstanding Featured Actor (Tyler Maynard, nominee)
Lucille Lortel Award Outstanding Sound Design (Simon Matthews, nominee)
Drama League Award Distinguished Production of a Musical (nominee)
Drama League Award Distinguished Performance Award (Ryan Duncan, David Josefsberg, Andy Karl, Tyler Maynard, Scott Porter, nominees)
Theatre World Award (Tyler Maynard, winner)

Cast recording
Altar Boyz was recorded in March 2005 and was released on May 17, 2005, by Ghostlight Records (an imprint of  Sh-K-Boom Records).

References

External links

 MichaelPatrickWalker.com Official site for Composer/Lyricist Michael Patrick Walker
 DelAguila.info Official site for Book Writer Kevin Del Aguila
 StaffordArima.com Official site for Off Broadway Director Stafford Arima
 Robyn Goodman (producer) - Downstage Center interview at American Theatre Wing.org, August 2005
 AltarHolics.com Official Fan Site
 TheProducersPerspective.com Blog for one of the producers of the Off Broadway production

2005 musicals
Off-Broadway musicals
One-act musicals
LGBT-related musicals
Criticism of the Catholic Church
Plays set in New York City